The Nun languages are a group of Eastern Grassfields languages spoken by the Bamum (Mum) and related peoples of the Western High Plateau of Cameroon.

The languages are: 
Bamum (Mum, Shu Paməm; Bapi dialect)
Baba (Bapa)
Bafanji (Fanji, Chufie)
Bangolan (Ngolan)
Bambalang (Mbalang, Chrambo)
Munga'ka (Ngaaka)
dialects: Li (Bali Nyonga), Ndeng (Bandeng), Ti (Bati)
core: Bamali (Mali, Chopechop), Bamenyan (Mamenyan), Bamukumbit (Mankong), Ndzerem

References

 
Languages of Cameroon
Eastern Grassfields languages